The 1950–51 Ashes series consisted of five cricket Test matches, each of six days with five hours play each day and eight ball overs. It formed part of the MCC tour of Australia in 1950–51 and the matches outside the Tests were played in the name of the Marylebone Cricket Club. The England team under the captaincy of the big-hearted all-rounder Freddie Brown was regarded as the weakest sent to Australia and "without Bedser and Hutton, England would have been little better than a club side". Few gave them a chance of regaining the Ashes and they lost the series 4–1 to Lindsay Hassett's Australian team, which had far greater reserves of talent. In the Fifth and final Test England beat Australia for the first time since 1938 and ended their unbeaten run of 14 Tests against England, 26 Tests against all teams and 96 games in all cricket since the Second World War. After this victory England would defeat Australia in 1953, 1954–55 and 1956.

It was a great all round team effort from the Australians; the captain Lindsay Hassett made 366 runs (40.66), Neil Harvey 362 runs (40.22), Keith Miller 350 runs (43.75) and Jim Burke 125 runs (41.66). The fast bowler Ray Lindwall took 15 wickets (22.93), his new-ball partner Keith Miller 17 wickets (17.70), Bill Johnston 22 wickets (19.18) and the mystery spin of Jack Iverson 21 wickets (15.23) in his only Test series. This was the first Ashes series to be played since the retirement of Don Bradman and it saw the debut of Ken Archer, Jim Burke, Graeme Hole and Jack Iverson for Australia and John Warr and Roy Tattersall for England.

Despite their defeat it was two English players who dominated the series; Len Hutton "a Titan among the minnows" made 533 runs (88.83) with an average double that of any other batsman, English or Australian. Alec Bedser took 30 wickets (16.06) and began his dominance of Australian batsmen that would continue into 1953, when he and Hutton would be instrumental in regaining the Ashes for England. The forty-year-old Freddie Brown had a successful series and won considerable popularity with his jovial determination to fight on regardless of the odds. Given the close results in the First and Second Tests it is possible that England could have won had Bill Edrich or Jim Laker been brought over, or Denis Compton had been fully fit. The Middlesex strokemaker had a chequered tour, averaging 7.57 in the Tests and 92.11 in his other First Class matches.

First Test – Brisbane

Preliminaries
The First Test between Australia and England is played nowadays at Brisbane. Nobody seems to know why, and all sorts of arguments are ventilated for and against more cricket Tests on the Woolloongabba ground. I am all in favour of robbing Queensland of its greatest cricketing occasion, for the ground depresses. It is not a cricket ground at all. It is a concentration camp! Wire fences abound. Spectators are herded and sorted out into lots as though for all the world this was a slave market and not a game of cricket. The stands are of wood and filthy to sit on. The dining rooms are barns, without a touch of colour or a picture on the wall. Everywhere there is dust and dirt...The field is rough, although the wicket is usually a good one until it rains. Then it is a strip of turf with thousands of demons prancing up and down...at Brisbane only a Hutton could stay, let alone score runs.
John Kay

Selection of the Australian team would seem to be a simple process as eight of its members were highly talented cricketers who almost picked themselves; Lindsay Hassett, Arthur Morris, Neil Harvey, Don Tallon, Keith Miller, Ray Lindwall, Ian Johnson, and Bill Johnston. Don Tallon replaced Ron Saggers who had kept wicket on the tour of South Africa in 1949–50, which Tallon had missed. Ray Lindwall had been dropped for the last Test in South Africa, his form suffering from a series of ailments, but was recalled to the team to replace Geff Noblet. Batsmen Jack Moroney and Sam Loxton kept their places, but leg-spinner Colin McCool was replaced by the 35-year-old debutant mystery spinner Jack Iverson. The task for the England tour selectors was not quite so easy. The managers Brigadier Michael Green and John Nash, captain Freddie Brown, vice-captain Denis Compton and senior professional Len Hutton kept most of the team from the Fourth and final Test against the West Indies in 1950. This was not the best recommendation as they had lost the series 3–1 and the last Test by an innings even though Hutton carried his bat for 202 out of 344. Freddie Brown, Denis Compton, Len Hutton, Reg Simpson, John Dewes, Trevor Bailey, Arthur McIntyre, Alec Bedser, Doug Wright all stayed, but the young opener David Sheppard was replaced by veteran Cyril Washbrook and Godfrey Evans returned as wicket-keeper. Apart from Hutton, Washbrook, Compton and Simpson the batsmen were not in fine form. Dewes was chosen after he had made a gritty 117 against Queensland in the last tour match before the Test. The reserve wicket-keeper Arthur McIntyre was in the team for his batting and as Brown's Cows were desperately short of good fielders and McIntyre had a good throwing arm. While the crowd was waiting for the captains to come out and toss a dapper little man came out and inspected the pitch and he passed by the spectators completely unnoticed. It was the Test selector Sir Donald Bradman, such is fame. Keith Miller had recently made a slow 201 not out against Queensland on the flat Woolloongabba pitch and predicted that the Test would be "the dullest in history". Lindsay Hassett won the toss (as he would 9 times out of 10 in Ashes Tests) and although the Woolloongabba Ground had a reputation as "result" wicket it looked plumb and he batted without hesitation.

Australia – First Innings
Seldom has an England cricket team gone into the field with the odds greater against them than did the side under Freddie Brown's command at Brisbane on the first day of December 1950. The tour had up to that date been one long succession of inglorious displays that had riled the critics without exception...it was no exaggeration to state that before the game began not one man in the crowd of 13,000 was prepared for the shocks that followed.
John Kay
Brown called his team together the night before the Test began. His first words were "Chaps, you have got to get stuck into this with me. I have not lost faith. We can win if we go out there to-morrow and get stuck right into it." He told them that he knew they had not produced their English form. He told them that their batting, bowling, fielding and catching were too often just too bad to be true. Chosen, as they were, to represent their country, they obviously could do better. Brown's told them just what he thought of everything. He finished by saying that if they went on to the field on the morrow with confidence in themselves, they could do the job.
Jack Fingleton
One of the good points about the tour so far had been the rise of Trevor Bailey as new ball partner for Alec Bedser. He bowled the first over, but mistimed his run up for the first ball and had to walk back and start again, swinging his fourth ball to tickle the edge of Jack Moroney's bat and send it to Len Hutton at fine leg for a duck.

Neil Harvey joined Arthur Morris and they took the score to 66/1 by lunch, though Morris constantly played and missed at Bedser's in-swingers and made only 24 runs to 38 by the more fluent Harvey. Doug Wright (1/81) came on to bowl a typical over with two long hops, which Harvey cracked into the square-leg fence, but the first ball of the next had him groping at a googly that turned so fiercely that it missed both bat and stumps, "a real pearl that morally bowled Harvey all the way". The following ball had Wright appealing for lbw, but it was turned down as it turned so much that it would have missed the stumps.

Returning after the break Bedser dismissed the labouring Morris lbw to bring Keith Miller on at 69/2. England's fielding had dramatically improved over its reputation on tour – Bedser had bowled seven eight ball overs for 6 runs – but these two strokemakers increased the run rate much to the joy of the crowd. Miller hit a typical Doug Wright over for 12 as he served up a mixture of full tosses, long hops, googlies, fierce leg-breaks and cunningly flighted balls. Harvey's 50 with 6 boundaries brought a cheer from the crowd, and he hit 3 more, a cover-drive and a pull off Bedser and dancing three steps down the wicket to hit Wright to the sightscreen. The Kent spinner returned to the wicket with his hop, skip and a jump and bowled a googly that Miller mishit it to a surprised Arthur McIntyre at short mid-on to have him out for 15.

Lindsay Hassett was almost out first ball to Bedser, but a difficult chance was missed by Denis Compton and the Australian captain took a single. Bedser then bowled one of his rare out-swingers to Neil Harvey, Godfrey Evans taking the catch and whipping off the bails to have the Victorian left-hander caught and stumped, but the bowler's umpire responded first and Harvey was "c. Evans b. Bedser" for 74.

Hassett did not survive long, his off-stump was knocked over by a Bedser "special" and from 116/2 Australia had collapsed to 129/5. Freddie Brown came on the relieve Bedser and Evans took another great catch to remove Loxton (24), though Ray Lindwall (41) saw Australia to tea for 166/6.

Brown (2/63) continued after the break, mixing up his medium-paced seamers with leg-spin to have the out of form Australian wicket-keeper Don Tallon caught by Reg Simpson on the square leg boundary at 172/7.

Lindwall and Ian Johnson held things up for three-quarters of an hour while adding 47 before Bailey (3/28) took the new ball. Simpson caught Johnson off Bailey and Bedser took Lindwall to give Bailey his third wicket.

Bedser was brought back on and Bill Johnston flipped him over the slips to the boundary. As he came to a halt half way down the pitch he stopped to chat with Alec while Iverson completed two runs. Only now did Johnston realise that Reg Simpson had stopped the ball and was throwing it in to Evans. He ran back towards his crease running like a duck trying to take off from water alongside Iverson making his third run. Johnston got home, Iverson stopped two yards short to turn back to the bowler's end, but Evans missed the bowler's stumps and he was safe.

After this comedy routine Bedser (4/45) had Bill Johnston caught by Hutton in the slips to dismiss Australia for 228 ten minutes before stumps, the last 4 wickets falling for just 9 runs. This low score after Australia had chosen to bat on a good wicket was a coup for the touring team, whose performance surprised everyone, it now only remained to see how well their batsmen could perform.

England – First Innings
...the ball proceeded to perform capers all against the laws of gravitation, and there came the craziest day's cricket imaginable, with twenty wickets falling for 130 runs and two declarations that must surely be unique in the annuals of Test cricket.
John Kay

On the recommendation of an MCC committee member in Australia the tour selectors had decided to demote Len Hutton – the best opener in the world – to bat at number 5 so that he could stiffen the fragile lower order. This was possible as they had two other openers in Cyril Washbrook and Reg Simpson and Hutton declined to object as he was outvoted and did not want to appear obstinate. The two new openers went out to the middle on the first day, but Simpson successfully appealed for bad light and no ball was bowled. It rained on the Saturday morning and though it dried out on the rest day that followed more rain poured down overnight and play was suspended until the Monday afternoon. Keith Miller and Denis Compton took advantage of the situation by going to the local horse racing track, ringing the ground to check when play was to resume and dashing back just in time.

Although other First Class games had their pitches covered they were not for Test matches – a ruling that would change as a result of what was to follow. The pitch was reduced to a "mudheap", "sticky dog" or "glue-pot" so beloved by purists as only a batsman with classic technique could hope to play on it, in other words Len Hutton. The roller reduced the effects of the rain and Simpson (12) and Washbrook (19) added 28 for the first wicket while the going was good.

The wicket-keeper Godfrey Evans (16) was brought in as a "daywatchman" while the pitch dried out to normality. Ray Lindwall bowled only one over before being taken off and Keith Miller (2/29) and Bill Johnston (5/35) were brought on by Hassett to exploit the conditions with their part-time spin as England collapsed from 49/1 to 67/7 as good length balls leapt chest-high, shot along the ground, turned and straightened.

Brown declared on 68/7, 160 runs behind, a move without precedent in Test cricket, but the England captain wanted to get the Australians onto the pitch before it dried out and became inhabitable. With hindsight he should have delayed as Hutton was still 8 not out and could have added some runs. As it was England was forced to bat again before stumps, but few captains anticipate getting Australia 32/7.

Australia – Second Innings
...the ball hit first a thigh, then a chest. Sometimes it would go over the batsman’s head, and whenever it came through at a playable height one of the many pairs of snatching hands in the leg trap took a catch that spelled doom first to Morris, then Loxton and finally Harvey. Miller, Moroney, Ian Johnson and Hassett preferred to thrust their legs in the way and found the umpire in league with the opposition on this afternoon of "crazy" cricket.
John Kay

If the English batsmen had struggled the Australians completely floundered. Jack Moroney, Arthur Morris and Sam Loxton were out for ducks and Australia were 0/3 in a matter of minutes as Trevor Bailey took his new best Test figures of 4/22 and Alec Bedser 3/9. This was the worst start to a Test innings until Alec Bedser and Fred Trueman reduced India to 0/4 at Headingley in 1952. Neil Harvey top-scored with 12, but the only runs came from the edge of the bat and after an hour Hassett gave up and declared on 32/7, leaving England 193 to win. This was a gamble as although there was still time to take quick wickets the pitch might recover the next day.

England – Second Innings
At Brisbane, on a wicket that was the worst that I have ever seen, the Yorkshireman was superb. The head-high bouncer was safely ignored. The chest-high deliveries of both the pace men and the spinners were played safely to the ground, out of the way of the many grasping hands in the leg-trap, and Hutton's display was a perfect lesson in the art of batsmanship...that will long remain in my memory, being by far the best innings I have ever seen played.
John Kay

The batting captain is allowed seven minutes of rolling before his innings and Freddie Brown asked for the heavy roller to press down the wicket and take some of the demons out of it. In those days the Woolloongabba still used an old heavy roller drawn by a horse called Dobbin. As it had to be unhitched and led round after each pull of the roller over the pitch, most of the seven minutes was wasted and Brown did not get much of the rolling he asked for. This was of great importance as if he had insisted on seven minutes actual rolling instead of messing about at either end the wicket would have been much less dangerous and England would have had less time to bat out before stumps. Though as Bill O'Reilly pointed out the time limits were devised when horse-drawn rollers were the norm and mechanical rollers were unheard of. Initially it made no difference as Reg Simpson was bowled first ball by a full toss from Ray Lindwall (2/21). The veteran England scorer Bill Ferguson was using his famous Ferguson Charts to record the details of each innings; how many runs a batsman had scored, how many balls, how many minutes, how many boundaries, etc; When Simpson was out one wag called out "How long Bill, and how many fours?" which produced a roar of laughter from the press box that astonished the crowd.

Cyril Washbrook (6) and John Dewes (9) were determined to see out the day with dead bats and the wicket showed no signs of danger, but Sam Loxton took a superb catch to get rid of the Lancastrian (Washbrook) off Lindwall. Jack Iverson was called up to bowl his first Test over 27 minutes before stumps and had Trevor Bailey in all kinds of trouble as his poked and prodded and could have been out five or six times in the mystery spinner's maiden over. Dewes was bowled by Keith Miller and with one over from Iverson remaining, Alec Bedser came out and immediately appealed against the bad light, but was turned down as he had yet to face a ball.

Bedser holed out to Neil Harvey off Iverson, Bailey gave a simple catch to Bill Johnston and Godfrey Evans ran out his fellow wicket-keeper Arthur McIntyre when he called for an unnecessary third run.

Brown had fed in nightwatchman after nightwatchman in order to save Hutton, Compton and himself for the next day, but the Man from Pudsey still had to come out at 30/6 to survive the last two balls of an extraordinary day. When asked for his opinion that night Hutton said they might win "if the others will stay till lunch and it doesn't rain again". It did not rain again, but needing 163 to win with only four wickets in hand there was no room for mistakes.

In the morning Brown, the umpires and a stopwatch ensured that England got their full 10 minutes rolling at the start of the day, which took nearly half an hour to complete. Evans (5) helped Hutton add 16 runs before he was caught by Loxton off Bill Johnston (2/30). Denis Compton came to the crease, but lasted one ball as he departed like Evans "c Loxton, b Johnston".

Brown came in at number 10 and held on grimly as Hutton peeled off 3 boundaries, though in the end the captain made 17 of their 29 runs together before he became Loxton's fourth victim when he was caught off Iverson (4/43).

Doug Wright was the last man in at 77/9 and his batting tended to be a hit-and-miss affair which rarely reached double figures. Hutton (62 not out) farmed the bowling ruthlessly, making 43 of the 45 runs added for the last wicket. Wright managed to hold a straight bat up to the few balls he was left to face until the last four balls from Iverson before lunch. He kept out the first three, but spooned the last to Ray Lindwall at square leg and the match was over. The 12,000 strong crowd gave Hutton an heroic ovation and after lunch he replied to the congratulations showered on him with by admitting that "with a bit of luck I'd have won the game".

Result

Australia's cricket ego was in no way deflated by what happened at Brisbane. All teams have their bad days, and that generally was considered sufficient excuse for Australia's collapse for 228 on a plumb pitch: as for the other collapse – Australian cricket thought does not believe in pondering long over national deficiencies on a sticky pitch. The possibility of a wet pitch in Brisbane was suggested by other Tests there and the weather preceding the game. There was too many clouds about in Brisbane for the city to miss rain for a whole week. Old women of both sexes [sic] were blaming our weather upsets on the atomic bomb experiment carried out by the Americans on Bikini Atoll, to our north... and so there was no national caterwauling over Australia's loss of face at Brisbane. Few stopped to think that had Australia lost the toss, they would have certainly have lost the Test.
Jack Fingleton

Australia won the First Test at Brisbane by 70 runs to go 1–0 up in the series, but the real winners were England and Australian cricket. Before the match the press and public had been contemplating a one-sided contest in which a weak England team would be overwhelmed by Australia, now they had a fighting series on their hands. Few Australians fail to credit a gutsy performance and the stock of the tourists rocketed. It was also apparent that Australia had a chink in their armour as their batting collapsed on a perfectly good wicket on the first day and had been badly shown up on the rain-affected wicket on the third, but their bowling remained strong and Jack Iverson (4/43) had justified the selector's confidence in him.

Second Test – Melbourne

Preliminaries
It was apparent that Brown could just string together a Test Eleven, and that was all. Nothing had been more disappointing that the continued poor showings by the young men of the side. Bailey was the only new-comer to lend an accomplished hand. So badly had the others shaped that Close...was to be given a Test berth in Melbourne on the strength of a second innings century against a country team at Canberra.
Jack Fingleton
The main story leading up to the Second Test at the Melbourne Cricket Ground was the health of the England vice-captain Denis Compton. His famously damaged knee had swollen up after making another century – 115 vs an Australian XI – and hourly bulletins were posted by the MCC manager Brigadier Michael Green expressing optimistically that he would play in order to help draw a large crowd for the Test, though doubts where express by those who had seen him. In the end he was unfit to play and was replaced by the Welsh amateur batsmen Gilbert Parkhouse who had made 58 in the Australian XI game, adding 130 with the luckless Compton. The reserve wicket-keeper Arthur McIntyre was also dropped from his batting role and the teenaged Brian Close was brought in as the best of a bad bunch, having hit 105 not out against long hops and full tosses served up in a minor game. Brown thought that if nothing else as an all-rounder he could help take some of the strain off the other bowlers and so Close became the youngest Englishman to play Australia in a Test. Australia made only one change, dropping Jack Moroney for having made a pair in the First Test. His successor was chosen in the Australian XI game and opener Ken Archer (12th man at Brisbane) was given his Baggy Green ahead of the middle order batsman Jim Burke (who was made 12th man), although he had only made 81 to Burke's 128. Lindsay Hassett won the toss and batted first on a yellow, matted wicket made for batting.

Australia – First Innings
...at Melbourne the young boys and girls go almost hysterical...I know several English cricketers who used to breath a sigh of relief whenever they reached the security of their quarters without the loss of a tie, a button, or even a cap...no film stars ever had more adulation that did the cricketers of England and Australia – especially the young ones – for the few brief days around Christmas at Melbourne in the year 1950.
John Kay

It was too much to hope for that Alec Bedser would dismiss Arthur Morris cheaply for the third time in a row, but he did in his second over and the Australian vice-captain was taken by Len Hutton in the slips for 2. Neil Harvey (42) came in at 6/1 and Australia were 67/1 at lunch despite the bowling of Bedser (who bowled unchanged throughout the morning) and Bailey and surprisingly good English fielding. Hassett even apologised to Brown as the ball was constantly fell just short of the slips, or flew over their heads as Harvey rode his luck. After lunch Bedser tickled Harvey's edge with a ball that Godfrey Evans snapped up instinctively, but had he missed few would have realised was a chance. The big bowler then held onto Ken Archer (26) in the slips by throwing himself to the ground and taking the ball in his outstretched right hand and Australia were 89/3. Keith Miller, whose matinée idol looks greatly affected his teenager fans, made 18, but his potential boundaries were stymied by Cyril Washbrook in the covers and Reg Simpson on the boundary-fence and he was trapped lbw by Freddie Brown (1/28) to bring Australia down to 93/4 on a good pitch on a perfect sunny day. Lindsay Hassett played a careful captain's innings of 52, adding 84 in an hour and a half with Sam Loxton (32). Brian Close was a short-leg to Hassett and kept on edging closer until he was almost face-to-face. He was brought on to rest Bedser and Bailey before the new ball was taken and Loxton was given "not out" when he appeared to give Hutton a straightforward catch in the gully. Soon after Loxton was out to a catch by Evans off Close when he didn't make contact and he glared at the umpire; "Tha' were lucky once, Sam" said Hutton "so don't grouse" and Australia were 177/5, which soon became 177/6 when Bedser yorked Hassett while loosening up with the old ball. The new ball was taken and Bedser (4/37) and Bailey (4/40) promptly cleared up the tail for 17 runs and Australia were all out for 194 at stumps.

England – First Innings
...the Yorkshireman's bewildered look, as he walked slowly away, set all tongues wagging, and the fact that Close came and went passed almost unnoticed. Many were the theories advanced in support of Umpire Cooper, an Adelaide man, during the interval, but the dressing-rooms on both sides seethed with indignation, and Hutton had the consolation of knowing that several of the Australians nearer to the ball than Iverson, considered a mistake had been made.
John Kay
With Australians out for their third low score in a row and with no rain in sight England had every chance of making a large total on a good wicket and equalising the series. It was an opportunity they did not take as Ian Johnson caught Reg Simpson (4) off Keith Miller (2/39), who then took a magnificent driving catch to take John Dewes (8) off Bill Johnston (2/28). Cyril Washbrook was joined by Len Hutton – still batting in the middle order – to re-establish their old partnership and set about restoring the innings. Washbrook (21) made some charming cover-drives before he was given out lbw to Ray Lindwall (2/46), although only he and Don Tallon appealed and the other nine fielders remained silent. Jack Iverson was brought on and saw a ball flick off Hutton's pads as he checked a sweep (it was the over before lunch). Iverson yelled "Catch it", Tallon dived forwards to take the ball an inch off the ground and the bewildered opener was given out for 12. Only Iverson appealed and "Not even Tallon, one of the most notorious appealers of all time, asked for a catch". and Miller, standing four feet away at silly-leg "stood there with his arms folded, feet wide apart, completely uninterested" Hutton returned to the pavilion with a face like thunder and Umpire Cooper was obviously upset that he so obviously disagreed with the decision and ended the over after only seven balls. One Yorkshireman was soon followed by another as Brian Close swished a ball to Sam Loxton and England went into lunch on 54/5. Captain Freddie Brown and Gilbert Parkhouse returned to the crease after lunch and made the best of things, but the Welshman's stilt-like footwork was his undoing and he was caught by Hassett off Miller. He was replaced by Trevor Bailey who steadfastly defended at one end while his captain brought the crowd to its feet hitting Johnson straight down the ground for six and through the covers for four. He hit three more boundaries in his 62 and they added 65 for the seventh wicket. Bailey was out first, bowled by Lindwall and Brown was caught by Johnson off Iverson. Godfrey Evans hit Lindwall straight to the boundary and took 8 runs off Miller, which resulted in a bouncer, which the keeper dodged like a boxer, and the bowler being booed. Evans cracked another four past point off Miller, who was removed from the attack, and passed 1,000 runs in Tests, but was "c Johnson, b Iverson" for 49 and was cheered by the crowd when he left. Alec Bedser (5 not out) had batted for nearly an hour helping Evans, but Doug Wright (2) only lasted five minutes and England were out for 197, exceeding Australia's First Innings by only 3 runs. This was both a failure and a relief, given how the innings had progressed.

Australia – Second Innings
Australia was 151 for seven – and the man wreaking the havoc was F. R. Brown! That was the remarkable part of this afternoon of sensations...one would not expect him to run through a first-class side of batsman, yet here was his name on the board with three Test batsman to his credit at a very small cost and at a very vital stage of the game. With his sun-hat on, a 'kerchief tied round his neck, and an ambling jovially in the field, Freddie Brown lacked only a wisp of straw in his mouth to make him look like the original Farmer Brown.
Jack Fingleton
Ken Archer (15 not out) and Arthur Morris (10 not out) saw Australia safely to Christmas Eve with 25/0 and a 22 run lead. They returned on Boxing Day and took their partnership to 43 when Morris (18) was lbw to Doug Wright and Ron Wright with the leg-spinner giving him a straight ball and the umpire raising his finger. Neil Harvey made another profitable second wicket stand before Archer (46) was taken in the gully by Trevor Bailey off Bedser (2/43) on 99/2. Harvey soon went, run out by Cyril Washbrook who made a splendid pick up in the covers and threw down his stumps when backing up to Miller. Miller himself was bowled by Bailey (2/47), then Brown (4/26) broke the back of the Australian innings with the wickets of Loxton, Lindwall, Tallon and Hassett in spell of 4/5. The Australian wicket-keeper was snatched by a diving Trevor Bailey at second slip, which Bill O'Reilly called "truly sensational" and Jack Fingleton "unforgettable". Ian Johnson (23) decided to hit out on the advice of Keith Miller and added a vital 30 runs with Bill Johnston (6) before Bedser and Bailey got them out on 181 and closed the innings.

England – Second Innings

The flies were bad. Little black ones. They pestered the batsmen and fieldsmen incessantly. Ranjitsinhji once explained that his dismissal in Sydney by saying that a fly got into his eye as the vital moment, which could well be true. They are an intense annoyance to a batsman, who must time his last quick flip of his face as the bowler is a few yards off delivery.
Jack Fingleton

England needed 179 runs to win, not an impossible task even though John Dewes had been struck with a throat inflection and had been absent from the field. Brown continued with his opening partnership of Reg Simpson and Cyril Washbrook and kept Len Hutton in the middle order. To be fair they had made 212 for the first wicket against the West Indies at Trent Bridge earlier in the year. On this occasion they added 21 against Lindwall and Miller when the spinners were brought on. Washbrook always found "Wrong Grip Jake" difficult to play and was bowled by his googly. The nightwatchman Trevor Bailey by bowled by Ian Johnson (1/24) for a duck and England were 28/2 at stumps. Simpson and Hutton "opened" the innings again in the morning, Hutton was inclined to fancy England's chances if he stayed in past lunch, and he did, but Simpson was bowled by Lindwall (3/29) for 28. John Dewes, coming in to bat from his sick bed like Eddie Paynter in the Fourth Test of 1932–33, stayed in for 46 minutes making a gutsy 5 before falling to Iverson (2/36) at 82/4. In the lunch break England needed less than a hundred runs to win and there was an earnest discussion as to whether Hutton should bat in his usual careful way or should try to make the runs before he ran out of partners, as had happened at Brisbane. He decided on the latter and by forcing the pace struck out at Bill Johnston (4/26) and was caught at square leg for 40, which caused a deathly silence across the 50,000 strong crowd. As in the first innings Brian Close was soon out (lbw to Johnston for 1), Brown was bowled by Lindwall, who then removed Evans "with a ball which pitched outside the off stump, came in at a crazy angle and knocked back the off stump without leaving the turf by a centimetre". Gilbert Parkhouse, who batted manfully for 102 minutes and when he was out for 28 England were 134/9 and still needed 45 to win. Alec Bedser (14 not out) had nothing to lose and struck out with the bat before Doug Wright (2) succumbed to Johnston and England were out for 150.

Result
The remarkable part about the finish of this game was that Hassett and his fellow-Australians left the ground in complete silence. There was not the slightest evidence of jubilation at Australia's second victory of the rubber. Everybody, it seemed, wanted England to win.
Jack Fingleton

Australia won the Second Test at Melbourne by 28 runs to take a 2–0 lead in the series. It was the closest result in an Ashes Test since England's 12 run win at Adelaide in 1928–29. Once again the dismal performance of the Australian batsmen and the tight finish rebounded to England's credit. The all-round performance of Freddie Brown, who top-scored with 62 and took his best Test return of 4/26, proved that he wasn't a passenger in the England team. The Australians had the more consistent batting and a strong bowling attack, but it was Len Hutton's dismissal in the first innings that most saw as the deciding point of the Test.

Third Test – Sydney

Preliminaries
Because of a traffic jam I was outside the ground on the first day of the Test when the captains tossed. There was a terrific roar. "I take it," said the traffic policeman as I passed him, "that Brown has won the toss. Good on him. He deserves it."
Jack Fingleton

England now had to win the final three Tests if they wanted to regain the Ashes, for which the only precedent was when Don Bradman made three big centuries in the 1936–37 Ashes series to win 3–2 after being 2–0 down to Gubby Allen's England side. Sydney is a famous spinning wicket, though the three tour matches the MCC had seen many runs for few wickets. In the New South Wales game immediately before the Third Test they had made 553/8 with Len Hutton making 150 and Reg Simpson 259 and the fast-medium bowler John Warr took 4/67. As a result the unhappy Brian Close was dropped in favour of Warr, making his debut, and England went into the Test with Doug Wright as the only specialist spinner, supported by the part-time spin of Freddie Brown and Denis Compton. The leg-spinner Eric Hollies had taken 5 wickets (78.60) in his three games at the Sydney Cricket Ground and off-spinner Bob Berry was going for 4 runs an over in his containment role and were not chosen. Denis Compton was fit again and replaced the ailing John Dewes, but Gilbert Parkhouse stayed in the team thanks to his fighting 28 at Melbourne and 92 against New South Wales. Australia kept the same team from the Second Test, though if they had lost the performances of a few of them would have resulted in their being dropped. For the only time in Lindsay Hassett's career as captain he lost the toss in an Ashes Test and Freddie Brown was able to bat first on another flat batting track.

England – First Innings

Miller, in one spirited over, altered the whole course of the game. With the third ball of that eventful over he trapped Hutton with his legs in front of the wicket trying to defend against an inswinger which moved in late. The value of Miller's bowling lies wholly and solely in its surprise element. Just when he appears to be well under the control of the batsman he comes to light with a ball that can upset anyone...with the sixth ball of the over Compton played-on before he had opened his score. The seventh and eighth balls did everything else but put paid to Parkhouse's account. Miller deserved every bit of the thunderous applause which the big crowd handed him when the over was completed.
Bill O'Reilly
Brown dispensed with the experiment of having Hutton bat down the order and the old Roses opening partnership of Len Hutton and Cyril Washbrook went to the crease. Hutton was full of confidence, 19 runs came off the first three overs and Keith Miller asked for a new ball in the fourth. Umpire Elphinstone examined the ball and changed it for a new one, which he ground into the dust to take the shine off. Hutton insisted on a look and bounced on the grass a few times so that it would lose its shape. It made no difference as another 8 runs came of the next two overs and Miller was taken off, only to take a diving catch off Ian Johnson (3/94) to dismiss Washbrook. Miller said this was the finest catch of his career; "He played the perfect cut, but, fielding in the gully, I had anticipated the shot. I ran across before he played it, flung out my hand and held the ball. I was just as astonished as Cyril". Hutton (62) and Simpson (49) took the score to 128/1 when Miller was brought back on to bowl one of his most famous overs. He bowled a "super ball" to dismiss Hutton lbw and bowled Denis Compton for a duck when the ball clipped the edge of the bat and ricocheted into the stumps. Gilbert Parkhouse survived until tea, but Reg Simpson guided another ball from Miller to Sam Loxton at short-fine-leg and England were 137/4. The popular Freddie Brown strode out to the applause of the crowd hoping for some more Melbourne-style big-hitting and they were not disappointed. Hassett took the new ball, but Brown hit Bill Johnston to the fence, lofted Lindwall into the deep and cracked a straight-drive onto Umpire Barlow's foot. He added 50 with Parkhouse (25) before the Welshman pulled Ian Johnson to Arthur Morris at mid-on at 187/5. He was replaced by Trevor Bailey who held up one end while Brown scattered the in-field and clouted the Australian bowling round the ground. When he was finally out the next day, playing over a yorker from Ray Lindwall for 79, he had made his highest Test score, the highest for England so far in the series, and received a royal reception from the crowd. England was now 258/6, their highest innings of a low scoring series, but without their fiery captain they collapsed to 290 all out. Bailey had his thumb broken by a Lindwall bouncer at 263/6 and was taken to St Vincent's Hospital. Godfrey Evans struck 3 fours in his 23 not out, but Alec Bedser was bowled by Lindwall (2/60) and John Warr by Miller (4/37). Bailey returned at 281/8 and tried to bat one-handed before he was caught by Don Tallon of Ian Johnson. Doug Wright joined Evans, but was run out for a duck by his Kent team-mate, tripping over his bat and pulling a muscle as he rushed home and England were all out for 290.

Australia – First Innings
Brown had only himself and John Warr to bowl along with Bedser, and there began a performance that for sheer determination and willingness to work must stand unrivalled in Test history, for it was essential that runs should be kept down as well as wickets taken...
John Kay

The England bowling attack was badly depleted, Trevor Bailey was unfit to play and did not field and the leg-spinner Doug Wright, who might have been a real handful on the turning Sydney wicket, played for only a few overs before retiring. The bowling thus fell heavily on the shoulders of Alec Bedser, the 40-year-old captain Freddie Brown and debutant John Warr. They had no regular spinner and would have to rely on Brown's part-time leg-spin, the left-arm unorthodox spin of the injured Denis Compton and the comedy leg-breaks of Len Hutton. In the end Compton only bowled 6 overs and Hutton none; the bowling was completed by Bedser (43–4–107–4), Warr (36–4–142–0) and Brown (44–4–153–4), bowling eight-ball overs. The innings began with John Warr bowling to Ken Archer as Arthur Morris always batted second and his nemesis Alec Bedser bowled him with the first ball of the second over. Although Neil Harvey had made 74, 12, 42 and 31 batting at number 3 Lindsay Hassett finally saw that the left-handed strokemaker would fare better further down the order and came in himself. With rain expected over the weekend Brown set defensive fields and with the England fielding on top form Archer (44 not out) and Hassett (62 not out) slowly batted out the day for 110/1 despite the constant barracking of the crowd, who shouted "Get on with it!". There was rain on the rest day, but most of it avoided the ground and it rolled out well. When play resumed the wicket took a lot of pace and bounce from the ball and England were doomed to a long day in the field. Even so Godfrey Evans took a brilliant catch off a leg-glance by Archer (48) off Bedser, who was involved in the first 6 wickets to fall. Brown bowled a leg-spinner that fizzed off the pitch and beat Hassett (70) and missed the stumps, but his next ball the Australian captain hit a catch to Bedser at mid-on and his team was 122/3. The presence of Neil Harvey and Keith Miller at the crease against a depleted bowling attack would usually ensure a flow of runs, but while Harvey hit 39 in 79 minutes before being bowled by Bedser, Miller nudged his way at the funeral rate of 24 runs an hour. Sam Loxton survived a close run out when Cyril Washbrook brilliantly threw down his stumps, but was out for 17 when he hoisted a long hop from Brown into the hands of Bedser, who then caught Don Tallon lbw for 18. At 252/6 Australia were still 38 runs behind when Ian Johnson came to the crease and started to hit the ball around in his top Test score of 77, he added 150 with Miller in the highest seventh wicket stand for Australia since Clem Hill and Hugh Trumble made 165 at Melbourne in 1897–98. They took Australia past 300 and 400 for the first time in the series and Miller reached his century after 274 minutes. Brown bowled Johnson, had Lindwall lbw and had Australia 406/8. With the tail now in Miller lifted Warr for six, but ran out Bill Johnston and Jack Iverson to end the innings with his then highest Test score of 145 not out. He had taken Australia to 426 and gave them a lead of 136.

England – Second Innings
When a bowler of Jack Iverson's ability to control direction and length can spin the ball so far as that, no batsman is likely to give him trouble. I am certain that no batsman of my time, English or Australian, could have held the fort on this pitch against accurate spin-bowling.
Bill O'Reilly
Len Hutton and Cyril Washbrook started the innings in fine form against the fast bowlers, who struggled to make the ball lift on the unresponsive wicket. Lindsay Hassett soon took the off and brought on the spinners. Jack Iverson had not bowled in the first innings and with his negligible ability with the bat and in the field some thought he was due to be dropped. It was soon apparent that he was in complete control of the situation, his line and length were flawless and he was turning the ball from outside the off-stump past the leg-stump. He had Hutton out for 9, the ball was snicked behind, where the wicket-keeper Don Tallon knocked it to Ian Johnson in the slips who juggled the ball and dropped it, upon which Tallon dived across and took the catch. Reg Simpson showed his usual bad form against spinners and was caught behind for a duck (even though Tallon did not appeal) and Washbrook was bowled for 34 after hitting two boundaries off Johnson. England were now 45/3 and Iverson had taken 3/2. Denis Compton avoided his pair and held out for 104 minutes making 23, his highest score of a terrible series, before running out Gilbert Parkhouse for 18 and popping a catch to the hungry Ian Johnson off Bill Johnston (1/31). Evans whacked 14 runs with 3 fours before Johnson (1/32) bowled him. Trevor Bailey bravely came out to bat with one hand in plaster, much to the surprise of his captain who asked "What are the devil are you doing here, Trevor?", Bailey replied "I thought I would hold them up for a bit Skipper" and held up one end with his 0 not out. Iverson bowled Brown, Bedser and Warr to finish with 6/27 and as Doug Wright was absent hurt and England were out for 123.

Result

Brown and Bedser deserved at least two-day's rest – but the whole English side was in and out while the sun was still shining. One of the saddest sights I have seen on a cricket field was the weary Bedser trudging out to bat less than two hours after his marathon bowling effort...Bailey batted one handed and Wright did not bat. It was a sickening blow for the Englishmen, to lose by an innings after such heroic efforts by the bowlers, but Iverson was just too good.
Jack Fingleton
Australia won the Third Test at Sydney by an innings and 13 runs to win the series 3–0 and retain the Ashes. The victory was marred by the injuries that had crippled the England bowling attack and their depressingly slow run-rate. The England bowlers received great praise for their sterling efforts, but the hero was a "35-year-old flip-bowler, Jack Iverson, who, until he had played in the Brisbane Test, had never seen a Test played" Brown sent a telegram to Lord's requesting two new bowlers to replace Bailey and Wright and the fast-medium seamer Brian Statham and off-spinner Roy Tattersall of Lancashire were flown out. Unfortunately, he did not ask for a fresh batsman as the England batting could well have used the presence of Bill Edrich. As it was he went to Adelaide with too many bowlers that he couldn't use and few batsmen he could trust.

Fourth Test – Adelaide

Preliminaries
It was one of the poorest Test matches in technique and spirit that I have witnessed. It lacked virility from birth. The Australians came to it with no great spirit of adventure or relish after the Ashes had been won. The policy was, after winning the toss, to hold tight and let the pitch and the Englishmen go to pieces. What went to pieces, of course, was the game itself.
Jack Fingleton

Although Australia had wrapped up the Ashes there was still considerable interest in the series as many felt that Freddie Brown's team deserved a win for all their efforts. Since the Third Test they had won four games on the trot by 9 wickets, 10 wickets, an innings and 25 runs and 152 runs and morale was as high as it had ever been. After his dismal showing at Sydney the Australian vice-captain Arthur Morris asked to be dropped, he had been dismissed four times out of five by Alec Bedser (for 25, 0, 2 and 0) and was nicknamed "Bedser's Bunny". The selectors declined and instead dropped Sam Loxton after 11 consecutive Tests and brought in Jim Burke of New South Wales to strengthen the lower order batting. Loxton was an outstanding fielder and was still brought to Adelaide as 12th man. Roy Tattersall of Lancashire had been flown out as a replacement for the injured Doug Wright and was picked for his debut. This young off-spinner had topped the tables in 1950 with 193 wickets (13.59), including twenty 5-wicket hauls and six 10-wicket hauls. The England players had been singing his praises since they arrived in Australia, so there was much curiosity about him down under. Doug Wright's pulled leg-muscle has recovered and he would also play and Tattersall replaced Trevor Bailey, whose broken thumb had not yet mended. Gilbert Parkhouse was dropped and replaced by his fellow amateur David Sheppard and despite taking 0/142 at Sydney John Warr was kept in the team. The Adelaide Oval was notorious for being the flattest wicket in Australia, but had taken spin from the first morning in the tour match when the MCC (211 & 220) beat South Australia (126 & 153) by 152 runs. Even so when Lindsay Hassett won the toss he made the easy decision to bat first.

Australia – First Innings
Morris had become very fed up of hearing Bedser's name. He sat that morning at No. 13 table in the hotel dining-room and gave a shudder when he saw it – but decided to sit tight. This, then, was a happy day for him. he had come back to the ranks of Test batsmen again.
Jack Fingleton
The first Australian wicket fell before a run was on the board for the third time in the series, but it was Ken Archer who succumbed to Alec Bedser when he glanced the third ball of the day to Denis Compton at short fine-leg, though he hung about the wicket even after he was given out by Umpire Barlow. Having livened up the crowd the bowlers had a tough day as the Adelaide Oval was up to its usual standards. Arthur Morris batted a very careful and composed innings, the highest of his Test career as he laid his reputation as "Bedser's Bunny" to rest. He made 206 out of Australia's 371 before he was the last man out, spending 7 hours and 42 minutes at the crease and striking 23 boundaries in the process. He passed 2,000 runs in Tests and made his seventh Ashes century in four years, overtaking Victor Trumper and Bill Woodfull placing him behind only Sir Donald Bradman on the list of Australian century-makers against England. No other Australian batsman made 50, but he added 95 runs for the second wicket with Lindsay Hassett (43), 110 for the third wicket with Neil Harvey (44) and 76 for the fourth wicket with Keith Miller (44). Thereafter wickets fell sharply, the last five falling for 14 runs, and the innings ended when he was bowled by Roy Tattersall (3/95). The young Lancashire off-spinner had an impressive debut which justified his selection even though he had to borrow E.W. Swanton's boots because his feet had swollen on the flight. He began by conceding only 5 runs from his first 6 overs and spun the ball so much that it floated across the wicket before turning on the unhelpful wicket. He dismissed fellow debutant Jim Burke with a ball that he bowled at the leg stump so that Burke went down on one knee to sweep it, but it floated over the wicket and knocked over the off-stump. He also bowled Don Tallon, getting his three wickets without any help from the fielders. Alec Bedser returned figures of 3/74, but Hassett protected Morris early in his innings and Miller hit his first over of the second day for 15. Doug Wright took 4/99 and only Morris, a noted player of spinners, was able to master him, but John Warr (0/63) could still not take a wicket.

England – First Innings
The Yorkshireman was magnificent. This was not perhaps an innings to be compared with his Brisbane classic, but it was, nevertheless, batsmanship sublime, worth first a hundred and then 150, with off drives, late cuts, hooks and leg glances, all performed with that easy composure so completely the Yorkshireman's own.
John Kay

England's innings – like Australia's – revolved around their opener, in this case Len Hutton, who became the second Englishman to carry his bat through an innings against Australia, the other being Bobby Abel's 132 not out at Sydney in 1891–92. Hutton made 156 not out in England's 272, hit 11 fours and nobody else made 30. Ray Lindwall (3/51) dismissed Cyril Washbrook for 2 when the pedestrian Jack Iverson took a high, leaping catch when the batsmen heaved the ball to the leg-side. The spinners were soon on and Hutton hit Ian Johnson for two boundaries. He went two yards down the wicket and was almost stumped by Don Tallon for 34, but he nicked the ball and the deflection made Tallon miss both the catch and the stumping. Reg Simpson was the second highest scorer with 29 and together they added 83 for the second wicket before Simpson was bowled by the left-arm bowler Bill Johnston and England finished the day 96/2. The following morning Lindwall and Miller argued with Tallon that he ought to stand three yards closer to the stumps as the pitch was so slow. He refused and Lindwall bowled at a reduced pace, so nudged by Miller Tallon moved up for the third ball, which nicked Denis Compton's bat and the keeper took the catch low off the ground. Had he remained back Tallon could not have made the catch. The other England batsmen made a steady procession to and from the wicket as Bill Johnston (3/68) and Iverson (3/58) worked their way through the order as Hutton batted serenely on, now untouchable by any of the bowlers. David Sheppard almost ran Hutton out when he rushed down the wicket to get off the mark, Godfrey Evans tried to do the same, but Hutton wisely ignored him and the keeper scrambled back before his wicket was wrecked by Lindwall. Freddie Brown was caught leg before by Miller (1/30), who immediately appealed and Umpire Cocks gave him out, then the ball rolled back onto his stumps and knocked off a bail, so he ended up being bowled. Debutant Roy Tattersall was crowded by the Australian fielders and was caught by Neil Harvey off Iverson for a duck. John Warr was bowled for another duck by Bill Johnston. Doug Wright came in at 219/9 and held off the Australian attack for over an hour as he and Hutton added 53 for the last wicket, resembling their last stand at Brisbane. Lindwall wasn't recalled to the attack until after 5 o'clock and promptly caught the Kent spinner leg before wicket for 14. England were out for 272, 99 runs behind Australia and Hutton was applauded off the field by the Australian team.

Australia – Second Innings
M.C.C. captain Freddie Brown, and a joint manager of the team, Brigadier M. A. Green, were injured in a car accident on North Terrace, city, last night. Brigadier Green was admitted to the Royal Adelaide Hospital in a semi-conscious condition, suffering from a probable fractured nose, and Brown was treated for cuts to the head and left knee. Brown, who had four stitches inserted in his left knee and two in his head, is reported to have said soon after the accident that he would play today. Doctors at the hospital, however, think it is doubtful, because he will be suffering from stiffness. Brown told the police that he was driving along North Terrace when he swerved to avoid another car. In doing so he crashed head-on into a tram standard in the middle of the road.
Adelaide Advertiser, Wednesday, 7 February 1951

Australia now had three and a half days to set England an unreachable target and bowl them out. Ken Archer ran a four off Alec Bedser in the first over and Arthur Morris struck two boundaries off Doug Wright when he replaced John Warr in the sixth over. Archer called Morris for a run off Bedser, but they both hesitated in the middle and Morris was run out for 16 by a left-handed throw from David Sheppard. Lindsay Hassett was almost bowled first ball, but survived and Australia were 34/1 at stumps. Archer (32) and Hassett (31) returned in the morning to take the score along to 95/3, but it was Neil Harvey (68), Keith Miller (99) and debutant Jim Burke (101 not out) who put the match beyond doubt. Harvey and Miller ran the bowling ragged and added 99 for the fourth wicket until Harvey was bowled by Brown (1/14) and Miller chopped a ball from Wright onto his stumps. Doug Wright (2/109) and Roy Tattersall (1/116) were heavily punished and Bedser (0/62) was wicketless. Australia ended the fourth day 384 runs ahead and that evening Freddie Brown and Brigadier Green were hospitalised after a car crash returning from dinner with Sir Willoughby Norrie, the Governor of South Australia. A car had pulled out suddenly from a side street and Brown swerved into a post for holding electric tram lines. Brown left the hospital early in the morning, but was unfit to play and vice-captain Denis Compton became the first professional captain to lead England since Jack Hobbs when Arthur Carr was injured in 1924–25. He was unable to prevent Jim Burke from making a Test century on debut, the ninth Australian to do so (compared to 10 Englishmen at the time). John Warr took his first and only Test wicket when Ian Johnson cut the ball to Evans, who knocked it up on the first attempt then ran forward to catch it on the rebound. Umpire Cocks took so long to make a decision that Johnson walked (almost unheard in Australia) to give the long-suffering Warr his first Test wicket and a bowling average of 281.00, the highest by an England bowler. The 12th man Sam Loxton was sent out by Hassett to tell Burke that he could take all the time he wanted over his hundred and the dour stock clerk reached his target after 245 minutes at the crease. Hassett then declared at 403/8 to give England a day and a half to make 503 to win.

England – Second Innings
John in fact in these two Tests took one for 281, which caused a few of us thereafter childishly to hum in his presence the Ancient and Modern Hymn number 281, 'Lead us Heavenly Father, lead us', with emphasis on the lines "Lone and Dreary, Faint and Weary, Through the Desert thou did'st go." In fact, of course, it was J.J. Warr's prime virtue was that he never seemed either faint or weary, on the field or off. Laughter was seldom far away when he was about...
E.W. Swanton

No team has ever made 500 runs to win a Test, though Len Hutton and Doug Wright had played in the Timeless Test when England made 654/5 chasing 696 to win, but drew the match because they had to catch their boat home. Realistically England could only hope to draw and Len Hutton (45) and Cyril Washbrook (31) added 74 for the first wicket, the highest opening stand of the series. Bill Johnston (4/73) removed them both, Hutton taken by Sam Loxton at short-leg (substituting for Iverson, who twisted his ankle on the ball), who also caught Denis Compton for a duck. In between he had Washbrook lbw and England entered the last day on 114/3. Reg Simpson (61) and David Sheppard (41) batted out the morning in a stand of 91 that lasted 157 minutes. He was also out to Johnston, caught Burke and Miller (3/27) snapped up Godfrey Evans, Alec Bedser and Sheppard for 7 runs to leave them 228/7. Ian Johnson (2/63) had Roy Tattersall caught by Arthur Morris then bowled John Warr without a run being added and as Freddie Brown was absent injured England were out one hour and forty minutes from stumps on the sixth and last day.

Result
The South Australian Cricket Association made a presentation to Jim Burke to commemorate his performance in scoring a century in his first Test. In introducing the Lord Mayor of Adelaide, who performed the little ceremony, Mr Roy Middleton, the president, explained that it was the policy of the Association to recognize any outstanding performance carried out on the Adelaide Oval. He recalled to the minds of those present that both Morris and Compton had been honoured similarly four years previously when each of those batsmen had scored a hundred in each innings of the Test played at Adelaide. It was a pleasant thought on the part of the Association, but it was a great pity that they had overlooked Hutton's outstanding performance.
Bill O'Reilly

Australia beat England in the Fourth Test at Adelaide by 274 runs to take a 4–0 lead in the series. It was Australia's 26 consecutive Test without defeat, its 14 without defeat against England and it was England's seventh Test defeat in succession. After the tightly contested First and Second Tests and the crippling injuries in the Third Test this was Australia's most conclusive victory in the series.

Fifth Test – Melbourne

Preliminaries
The tide has turned but it is not yet high tide for England. There must be few people who did not welcome England's victory in the Fifth Test because it broke the monotonous string of Australian victories and sympathy was entirely with Freddie Brown and his men for the gallant performances they had put up throughout the tour.
Bill O'Reilly
Going into the final Test England dropped the luckless John Warr in favour of Trevor Bailey and Freddie Brown has recovered enough for him to retain his place as captain. The Australian selectors declined to use the game to test some new players and kept their team except to drop Ken Archer in favour of debutant Graeme Hole. Jim Burke was promoted to open the innings with Arthur Morris, even though he had failed as Morris' opening partner for New South Wales and had found success only as a middle order batsman. The players returned to Melbourne – scene of the Second Test – as in those days Sydney and Melbourne alternated having two Tests in the Ashes series. Ian Johnson played even though he had a foot infection, and was spared from bowling too much by Hassett. There had been thunderstorms in the week before the Test, and the outfield and bowler's run ups were soft. Lindsay Hassett won the toss as a matter of course and Australia batted first.

Australia – First Innings

Iverson, last man in, arrived on the scene with his old battle-axe bat. This bat, which must be one of the strangest ever to make an appearance in a Test match, is bolstered up with a solid slab of leather bound firmly round the blade. It has the colour of a very old violin. Its handle is so pliable that it can be twisted in all directions. It must have seen its best days when its owner was a little boy at school. It has been a scrap-heap job for years. But Iverson seldom places much strain upon it.
Bill O'Reilly
Jim Burke provided the customary early wicket to fall, caught by Roy Tattersall at forward short-leg off Alec Bedser after he swopped ends with Trevor Bailey. Regardless of his recent double-century at Adelaide Morris (50) "mistimed, misjudged and mishit", but managed to stay in as he and captain Lindsay Hassett (92) slowly increased the Australian innings. They were barracked heavily by the small crowd of 7,000 (in a stadium capable of holding 80,000) who wanted them to make way for the strokemakers Neil Harvey and Keith Miller. Their quality only became apparent when Morris was lbw to Brown at 111/2, closely followed by Harvey caught behind on 114/3 and Miller caught-and-bowled on 123/4 to give the England captain a spell of 3/0. The crowd increased to 20,000 as news of the England success traveled during the day and people came into see the fun. Hassett continued to hold the innings together, but Bedser worked his way through the line-up, bowling Graeme Hole and catching Ian Johnson lbw. Len Hutton took an excellent catch off Brown to dismiss the Australian captain 8 runs short of his century and another off Bedser to dispose of Don Tallon. Ray Lindwall (21) and Bill Johnston (12 not out) led a small fight back to get Australia from 187/8 to 206/8 at stumps and not for the first time England had the advantage on the first day. The injury-prone Trevor Bailey had fallen heavily when bowling and an X-ray over the weekend found that he had chipped a bone in his foot, but he came back to play. The second day was lost to heavy rain and fears of another Brisbane-like sticky rose, but the pitch dried out on the Sunday and flattened out nicely when pressed by the big electric roller on the Monday. Bedser (5/46) had Lindwall caught by Compton in second slip and Brown (5/49) had Iverson caught by Washbrook in the covers and the Australian innings closed on 217. It was Brown's best bowling and his only five-wicket haul in Tests.

England – First Innings
It was interesting to see the crowd's reaction to the English last-wicket partnership. They cheered every scoring shot and went into ecstasy over Tattersall's efforts. It was quite obvious that they had decided to fight the battle out for England and were plainly partisan...There are many Australians, and I am one of them, who believe that cricket will reach its highest level again when England and Australia are on level pegging. These were the people who cheered the tenth-wicket partnership to the echo.
Bill O'Reilly
The old firm of Hutton and Washbrook opened for England and added 40 runs in 32 minutes for the first wicket before Washbrook tickled a ball from Keith Miller into the gloves of Don Tallon. Brown thought that if the Australian bowling was attacked they would buckle under and England would get more runs, in any case Hutton hit 8 boundaries in his 79 and added 131 runs with Reg Simpson in 142 minutes, the only century stand of the series for England . With Hutton in fine form the Notts opener was able to play himself in and at 171/1 the English batsmen were in finally in control. In desperation Hassett brought on debutant Graeme Hole to try out his off-spinners and to everyone's surprise his fourth ball clean bowled the England opener and the Australian bowling attack took an interest in affairs again. Lindwall (3/77) and Miller (4/76) bowled with greater speed and hostility than at any time in the series and by stumps England were 218/6 with Compton, Sheppard, Brown and Evans all gone and Simpson (80 not out) left with Alec Bedser (3 not out). Lindwall bowled Bedser for 11 and Jack Iverson (2/40) disposed of Trevor Bailey and Doug Wright to bring last man Roy Tattersall in at 246/9 with England just 18 runs ahead. With Simpson on 92 the main concern was whether he would reach 100 on this his 31st birthday, but this was soon resolved when he hit 11 runs off his next over from Miller. Hassett spread out the field to allow Simpson to take singles so they could concentrate on Tattersall, who was surrounded with close fielders. The young Lancastrian kept a straight bat and Simpson cracked 6 fours as they hit 50 runs in the 34 minutes before lunch. Miller bowled Tattersall for 10 after the break and Simpson was left on 156 not out, his highest score in Tests and his greatest Test innings. Their stand added 74 runs in 55 minutes and took England to 320, their only score of the series over 300, and a lead of 103 runs.

Australia – Second Innings

Bedser was given a wonderful ovation when he came off the field with five more wickets to his name, and a match record of 10 for 105 – just one more instance of proof furnished by the Surrey man that on Australian wickets he is the world's outstanding pace bowler.
John Kay
Australian hopes that they could set England a good target received an immediate double blow as Alec Bedser sent Morris and Burke straight back to the pavilion. Lindsay Hassett and Neil Harvey salvaged a stand of 81 from the wreckage of 6/2, with Harvey swashbuckling his way to 52 in what Bill O'Reilly thought was his best innings of the series. He was torpedoed by a shooter from Doug Wright (3/56) and Freddie Brown (1/32) caught and bowled Keith Miller for a duck to leave them 89/4. Hassett found another partner in Graeme Hole and saw out the day at 129/4, but was skittled in the morning for 48 – Doug Wright's 100th test wicket – when a leg-spinner zipped one past his bat and toppled his off-stump. Wright finally showed why he was so feared on the county circuit when Ian Johnson lofted a googly to Brown at mid-off. Australia were now 142/6, a mere 39 runs ahead, but Hole stood steady for three hours making 63 until he was bowled by Trevor Bailey (1/32). Brown figured that if anybody deserved some easy wickets it was Bedser and the big Surrey bowler removed Lindwall, Johnston and Iverson for five runs and ending his superb tour with 5/59, 10/105 in the match. His 30 wickets (16.06) was the most by an English bowler in Australia since Harold Larwood's 33 wickets (19.51) in 1932–33.

England – Second Innings
Not once, but three times, the stumps were plucked by players eager to grab souvenirs of an historic occasion. First of all, the Australian captain bowled a full toss down the leg side and took it for granted that Compton would hit the ball to the boundary rails. He forgot that Compton was out of form and out of luck. Instead of the ball going to the rails, it was missed completely and poor Tallon, with his arms full of stumps and bails, had to drop the lot and take the ball.
John Kay
England needed 95 runs to win and "an earthquake would not have shaken Hutton's determination not to be out when until victory was gained". he made 60 not out, his fifth innings over 50 and fourth unbeaten innings of the series and hit the winning runs. Washbrook (7) and Simpson (15) did not last the pace, but Denis Compton finally had some luck as he made 11 not out. Lindsay Hassett bowled the last over with the fielders crowded round the batsman, not in the hope of a catch, but so they could fight Don Tallon and the umpire for souvenir stumps and bails. They jumped the gun twice, once when Hassett bowled a rank full toss down the leg side, expecting Denis Compton to sweep it to the boundary, so did the umpire who called no ball and grabbed two stumps, Hassett the other and Tallon three, but the Compton missed, Tallon dropped his stumps as he jumped on the ball and they had to start again. The next ball was a single, then with one run to win Hutton amused himself by smothering a full toss amidst the chaos. Play was held up until Ian Johnson returned a bail he had hidden in his pocket. Finally, Compton pulled a stump out the ground and ran down the wicket as Hutton pushed the ball wide of square-leg and trotted over the crease to be congratulated by Hassett while Tallon fought off the close fielders for the stumps. The English batsmen were cheered off the pitch and they shouted for Brown to give them a speech, which he did, giving particular thanks to Len Hutton and Alec Bedser. The team repaired to their hotel for toasts of Champagne "To England – and to Freddie Brown" and to read the congratulatory telegrams that poured in from all over the world.

Result
England beat Australia by 8 wickets, but still lost the series 4–1. It was the first Test England had won since the First Test vs the West Indies at Old Trafford in 1950, having lost the 7 intervening Tests. It was their first victory over Australia since the Fifth Test at the Oval in 1938, 15 Tests previously. The only survivors were Len Hutton and Denis Compton, the batsmen at the wicket when the winning runs were scored, and Lindsay Hassett, who bowled the final over. It was the first Test Australia had lost since the Oval in 1938 and ended their run of 26 Tests and 96 games in all cricket without defeat.

1950–51 Test series averages
Source As was the convention of the time gentleman amateurs have their initials in front of their surname and professional players have their initials after their name, if used at all. The Australians were all amateurs until the Packer Revolution, even though they played like professionals. Jack Iverson in his only Test series took 21 wickets (15.23), giving him the 10th lowest bowling average of those who have taken 10 or more Test wickets. Len Hutton's batting average (88.83) was double that of every other batsmen in the series. Keith Miller (43.75) topped the Australian batting averages, the lowest average to do so by an Australian since the 1911–12 Ashes series when Sidney Barnes and Frank Foster ran riot. Only five centuries were made in the series, the lowest in an Ashes series since 1920–21. England's 10th wicket stands produced 195 runs (32.50), better than for any other England wicket, except the 2nd, which made 412 runs (45.78).

The press corps
The 1950–51 cricket press corps presented a formidable team in its own right; Sid Barnes, Dick Whitington, John Kay, Jack Fingleton, Vivian Jenkins, Arthur Mailey, Harold Larwood, Evelyn Wellings, Bert Oldfield, Bill Bowes, Bill O'Reilly and Clarrie Grimmett. They played several games on the tour against minor teams and schools, including a Christmas Eve charity match against Bill Ponford's XI which presented £1,000 to a nursing charity and games against schoolboy teams in Perth, Brisbane, Sydney, Melbourne and Adelaide. The radio commentators included the Australian captain Vic Richardson and Arthur Gilligan the popular England captain of the 1924–25 Ashes series. Gilligan's "What do you think, Vic?" was inevitably followed by Richardson's "I dunno, what do you think, Arthur?", which became an Australian catchphrase.

References

Sources
 J.H. Fingleton, Brown and Company, The Tour in Australia, Collins, 1951
 John Kay, Ashes to Hassett, A review of the M.C.C. tour of Australia, 1950–51, John Sherratt & Son, 1951
 W.J. O'Reilly, Cricket Task-Force, The Story of the 1950–51 Australian Tour, Werner Laurie, 1951
 E.W. Swanton, Swanton in Australia with MCC 1946–1975, Fontana/Collins, 1975

Further reading

 John Arlott, John Arlott's 100 Greatest Batsmen, MacDonald Queen Anne Press, 1986
 Peter Arnold, The Illustrated Encyclopedia of World Cricket, W. H. Smith, 1985
 Ashley Brown, The Pictorial History of Cricket, Bison, 1988
 Bill Frindall, The Wisden Book of Test Cricket 1877–1978, Wisden, 1979
 Tom Graveney and Norman Miller, The Ten Greatest Test Teams Sidgewick and Jackson, 1988
 Chris Harte, A History of Australian Cricket, Andre Deutsch, 1993
 Gideon Haigh, Mystery Spinner: The Story of Jack Iverson, Aurum Press Ltd, 2002
 Alan Hill, The Bedsers: Twinning Triumphs, Mainstream Publishing, 2002
 Keith Miller, Cricket Crossfire, Oldbourne Press, 1956
 Ray Robinson, On Top Down Under, Cassell, 1975
 E.W. Swanton (ed), Barclay's World of Cricket, Willow, 1986

Ashes series
Ashes series
Ashes series
Ashes series
Australian cricket seasons from 1945–46 to 1969–70
International cricket competitions from 1945–46 to 1960
The Ashes